Øygarden Group is a group of rocky, irregular islands in Antarctica which extends about  in an east–west direction, lying in the southern part of the entrance to Edward VIII Bay. First sighted in February 1936 by Discovery Investigations personnel on the RSS William Scoresby, and considered by them to be part of the mainland. They were charted as islands by Norwegian cartographers from aerial photographs taken by the Lars Christensen Expedition in January–February 1937, and named Øygarden, a descriptive term for a protective chain of islands lying along and off the coast.

References

Islands of Kemp Land